The Copa América is South America's major tournament in senior men's soccer and determines the continental champion. Until 1967, the tournament was known as South American Championship. It is the oldest continental championship in the world.

Japan are not members of the South American football confederation CONMEBOL. But because CONMEBOL only has ten member associations, guest nations have regularly been invited since 1993.

Japan has competed as invitee in 1999 and 2019, but were eliminated in the group stage on both occasions. In 1999, two out of three Japanese goals were scored by Wagner Lopes, who was born in South America and only naturalized two years prior.

In 2019, head coach Hajime Moriyasu called up a squad consisting mostly of uncapped players under 23 years of age in preparation for the 2020 Summer Olympics hosted in Japan. This decision was considered as a lack of respect, a concern voiced by Venezuelan coach Rafael Dudamel among others.

In their home confederation, the AFC, Japan is the most successful team with four continental titles. The second of those titles was won in 2000, only one year after the disappointing results at the 1999 Copa América.

Record at the Copa América

Squads

Just like at the 1998 FIFA World Cup one year prior, the national squad only consisted of players from the J1 League. The 2019 squad consisted mostly of U23-players who would be eligible to play at the 2020 Summer Olympics.

Match results

Goalscorers

See also

Japan at the FIFA World Cup
Japan at the AFC Asian Cup

References

External links
RSSSF archives and results
Soccerway database

Countries at the Copa América
Japan national football team